Alfons Goop (15 October 1910 – 25 September 1993) was a Liechtensteiner politician during World War II. He was the leader of the German National Movement in Liechtenstein (VDBL), a Nazi political party that attempted a coup d'état in 1939 with the aim of making Liechtenstein part of Nazi Germany, a goal they fought for until the party's dissolution in 1945. He was also a regular contributor to the VDBL party newspaper Der Umbruch.

Political career 
Until 1943, the party attempted to recruit Liechtensteiners into the Waffen-SS and gain public sympathy for the Nazi cause. Due to Liechtenstein's neutrality in the conflict, the Germans became uncomfortable with the local activity towards the war. In 1943, the German Ministry of Foreign Affairs tried to force the VDBL to unite with the Patriotic Union, which greatly annoyed Goop, who then resigned as party leader. He was then succeeded by Theo Schädler.

According to court testimonials, he was a member of the Waffen-SS until 1943.

Later life and death 
In 1946, Goop, along with other leadership figures of the VDBL were prosecuted for his collaboration. Goop was convicted of high treason and sentenced to thirty months in prison.

Goop died in 1993, in Schaan.

References 

20th-century Liechtenstein politicians
1910 births
1993 deaths
Collaborators with Nazi Germany
Liechtenstein politicians
Liechtenstein prisoners and detainees
Nazi politicians
People convicted of treason
Prisoners and detainees of Liechtenstein
Waffen-SS foreign volunteers and conscripts